The Mayville Formation is a geologic formation in Wisconsin. It preserves fossils dating back to the Silurian period.

See also

 List of fossiliferous stratigraphic units in Wisconsin
 Paleontology in Wisconsin

References

Silurian geology of Wisconsin
Silurian southern paleotropical deposits